Jacques Goulet (baptised April 17, 1615 – November 26, 1688) was a pioneer settler to Canada who was part of the Percheron immigration movement recruited to colonize the shores of the Saint Laurence River at Québec in New France (now part of the province of Québec in Canada), a miller and the ancestor of all of the Goulets in North America. He is considered a "super-badass, even for his time."

Early life
Thomas Goulet, the father of Jacques Goulet, lived in France in ancient Perche province's Normandel hamlet in about 1593. The baptismal records of Saint-Maurice-lès-Charencey, a community two miles east of Normandel, document the birth of René Goulet on May 30, 1613 to Charles Goullet and his wife Susanne. It is likely that Charles Goullet is the brother of Thomas Goulet.

Thomas married Antoinette Feillard on April 28, 1613 in Normandel's Saint-Firmin church.

A notarized deed dated April 6, 1615 shows Thomas Goulet purchasing a gray horse for 25 livres from Robert Giguère, a merchant from Tourouvre and a cousin of Robert Giguère who also immigrated to New France. The eldest of three children, Jacques Goulet was born in Normandel on April 17, 1615; his sisters Louise and Yvonne, being born in 1619 and 1622, respectively.

Jacques Goulet worked as a miller for Noël Juchereau on his farm, Les Chatelets in L'Hôme-Chamondot, France in 1645. His father Thomas, also worked as a miller in L'Hôme-Chamondot in 1632, possibly at the same mill.
Goulet married Marguerite Mulier, the daughter of Jean Mulier and Catherine Chauvin, on November 21, 1645 at St. Pierre Church in La Poterie-au-Perche, France.

Immigration to New France

 

Noël Juchereau, a Company of One Hundred Associates investor, recruited Jacques Goulet to migrate to New France as Noël Juchereau's miller via a three-year-termed work contract at the end of which term Jacques Goulet was likely to be granted a land concession. Jacques Goulet was in his last year of a three-year contract to Noël Juchereau died in 1648.

In the spring of 1646, Goulet and his wife Marguerite sailed from La Rochelle for New France. In September or October, they arrived at Québec with 73 other immigrants on one of a fleet of four ships: the 300-ton Cardinal, the 150 ton Saint-Sauveur (or Neuf), the 50-ton Petit Saint-Christophe and the 250-ton Notre-Dame (destined for Montreal). In 1646, there were only around 1,000 colonists in Canada.

Life in Canada
Shortly after arriving at Québec, Goulet's wife Marguerite gave birth to their first child, Geneviève, on October 28, 1646. Geneviève died about six weeks later. She was buried on December 14, 1646.

Goulet was employed by Noël Juchereau, until Juchereau died in 1648, soon after a visit to France.

In December 1651, Goulet acquired land with one arpent of frontage on côte St. Michel near Sillery, Quebec City. He later sold the property along with another property with one-and-a-half arpents of land to Simon Legendre for 200 livres on December 26, 1655.

In Château-Richer, Goulet owned land consisting of six arpents of frontage.
He sold this property to partners Jacques Dodier and Pierre Pointel on November 30, 1656.
On March 4, 1657, Dodier gave the property back to Goulet who then sold it to Lauzon de la Citière for 860 livres, a significant sum.

On May 30, 1658, Olivier Le Tardiff, seigneur and judge for côte de Beaupré, a concession of land at L’Ange-Gardien. The land consisted of three arpents of frontage on the North shore of the St. Lawrence River near L'Ange-Gardien, near the stream Ruisseau des Originaux.

As of the 1667 censusFile:1667 Census, of New France for Goulet was farming 15 arpents of land and had five head of cattle. By the 1681 census, he had doubled his arable land. He also owned a gun and one of the New France's 78 horses.

From 1673 to 1676, Goulet worked as a miller at the mills of the seigneurie de Beaupré, Château-Richer's wind mill and the water mill of Sault à la Puce. He was also a miller at the water mill at Petit Pré (pictured) until at least 1682.

Children
Jacques and Marguerite had 11 children, of whom five died or were not recorded in subsequent census records because they did not marry.

Geneviève:  October 28, 1646 - December 14, 1646
Nicolas: December 14, 1647 - August 24, 1721; married Sainte Cloutier on November 24, 1672.
Jacques: April 9, 1649 - 1666.
René: October 27, 1650 - July 28, 1717; married Catherine Leroux on October 29, 1672.
Louis: August 26, 1653 - 16; married Marie Godin on July 8, 1682.
Charles: 1656 - November 10, 1717; married Marie-Anne Rancin on November 11, 1686.
Thomas: March 24, 1660 -  February 19, 1728; married Marie-Marguerite-Louise Pancatelin on October 25, 1683.
Francois: 1664-1665.
Antoine: August 20, 1666 - February 4, 1712; married Madeleine Guyon on February 19, 1692.
Joseph: March 27, 1669 - May 5, 1741; married Jeanne Julien on July 20, 1692.
Marguerite: June 27, 1675 - 1680.

Death
Jacques Goulet died November 26, 1688 and was interred in the church cemetery at L'Ange-Gardien two days later.

In 1694, Goulet's estate was inventoried. It consisted of one plow, more than 700 sheaves of wheat, two horses, 10 head of cattle, three pigs, 10 chickens, a stone house, a barn, a stable, 33 arpents of cleared land and various other items.

A plaque affixed to La Poterie's St. Pierre church reads: 
Jacques Goulet né le 17 Avril 1615 a Normandel et Louise Goulet née a La Poterie le 26 Juillet 1628 epouse de René Le Tartre partis de La Poterie pour Le Canada. 'Je me souviens'''"

Translation:Jacques Goulet born on April 17, 1615 in Normandel and Louise Goulet, born in La Poterie on July 26, 1628, wife of René Le Tarte, left La Poterie for Canada. I remember''

Name variations
In Canada and the United States, other name variations have evolved including Goulette, Goulait, Goulais, Desgoulets, Gooely, Gooley, Goula, Goulat, Goulah, Goulin and Gooler. A minuscule proportion of Goulets had the Mathurin dit name or nickname.

Flute
Goulet once owned a flute that had been passed down from generation to generation. A brief history of the flute was written about in an article in The Winnipeg Evening Tribune - June 7, 1934.  The last person to have possession of the flute was Robert Leon Goulet (1890-1955). It is not known what happened to the flute after Robert died. In June 2015, descendants of Jacques Goulet's, including the great grandson of Robert Leon Goulet, attempted to locate the flute, but was unsuccessful. In an attempt to locate the flute, the descendants of Goulet have created FindTheFlute.com.

Notable descendants
Métis Leader Elzéar Goulet
Author George R. D. Goulet
Politician Maxime Goulet
Singer Robert Goulet

References

Bibliography

External links

FindTheFlute.com

1615 births
1688 deaths
French emigrants to pre-Confederation Quebec
People of New France
People from Mortagne-au-Perche
Immigrants to New France